Streptomyces graminifolii is a bacterium species from the genus of Streptomyces which has been isolated from the plant Sasa borealis.

See also 
 List of Streptomyces species

References

Further reading 
 

graminifolii
Bacteria described in 2014